Delta is a ghost town in Coahoma County, Mississippi, United States.

Once a thriving port on the Mississippi River, Delta today is covered by farmland and a portion of the Mississippi Levee.  Nothing remains of the original settlement.

History
The county seat was moved from Port Royal to Delta in 1842.

In 1844, Delta was surveyed and laid off into lots.  The town had a population of about 700, and was a busy steamboat port.

Delta incorporated in 1848.  That same year, the river flooded the town, forcing many residents to relocate to nearby Friars Point.

The county seat was moved to Friars Point in 1850.

A post office operated under the name Delta from 1840 to 1890.

By 1890, nothing remained of Delta.

References

Former populated places in Coahoma County, Mississippi
Former populated places in Mississippi
Mississippi populated places on the Mississippi River